Leonid Vladimirovich Shevchenko (October 24, 1932 – March 17, 2017) was a Russian professional football coach.

References

External links
 Career summary by Footballfacts

1932 births
2017 deaths
Soviet football managers
Russian football managers
FC Zimbru Chișinău managers
FC Akhmat Grozny managers
FC Fakel Voronezh managers
FC Sibir Novosibirsk managers